Pat Cash and Mark Philippoussis were the two-time defending champions, but Philippoussis did not participate this year. Cash played alongside Henri Leconte, but lost to John and Patrick McEnroe in the final, 2–6, 4–6.

Draw

Finals

External links 
Men's Champions Doubles Draw

Men's Champions Invatiational